The 1988 John Hancock Sun Bowl, part of the 1988 bowl game season, took place on December 24, 1988, at the Sun Bowl Stadium in El Paso, Texas. The competing teams were the Alabama Crimson Tide, representing the Southeastern Conference (SEC), and the Army Cadets, competing as a football independent. The game put Alabama's air attack against Army's ground attack, and ended with Alabama just edging past Army in the fourth quarter to win the game 29–28.

Teams

Alabama

The 1988 Alabama squad finished the regular season with an 8–3 record and losses against Ole Miss, LSU and Auburn. The appearance marked the third for Alabama in the Sun Bowl, and their 41st overall bowl game appearance.

Army

The 1988 Army  squad finished the regular season with a record of 9–2 with losses coming against Washington and Boston College. The appearance in the Sun Bowl marked the first for Army in the game, and their third overall bowl game appearance.

Game summary
The Cadets opened the scoring with a one-yard Mike Mayweather touchdown run to take a 7–0 lead. The Crimson Tide responded with a 37-yard Philip Doyle field goal to cut the lead to 7–3 at the end of the first. In the second quarter, Army again scored on the run with Bryan McWilliams reaching the endzone on a 30-yard run. Alabama again responded with a 22-yard Philip Doyle field goal and a 7-yard Marco Battle touchdown reception from David Smith to close the gap to 14–13 at the half. Army went into halftime with a 14–13 lead by putting up 232 yards on the ground.

Alabama put together a 69-yard drive to take its first lead 20–14 in the game half way through the third quarter on a 23-yard Greg Payne touchdown reception. Army answered with another touchdown on the next drive to take the lead back at 21-20.  On Alabama's next drive David Smith was intercepted by Army's O'Neal Miller who returned it 57 yards for a touchdown and a 28-20 lead.  In the fourth quarter Alabama put together two scoring drives for a 32-yard Doyle field goal and a 2-yard David Casteal run to regain the lead at 29–28.

Army put up 350 yards on the ground against Alabama's 5th-ranked defense that gave up less than 100 yards per game on average during the season.  Army Coach Jim Young said about the game "Alabama was one of the better teams in the country. We played them and beat them in everything except the score." The El Paso Times ranks this game 11th among the top Sun Bowl games ever.

Legacy
Alabama quarterback David Smith later became a college football referee in the SEC; games he officiated include the 2013 Senior Bowl and 2018 Sun Bowl.

References

1988–89 NCAA football bowl games
1988
1988
1988
1988 in sports in Texas
December 1988 sports events in the United States